Glasgow Valley County Airport (Wokal Field) ) is a public airport a mile northeast of Glasgow, in Valley County, Montana, United States. It is served by one airline, subsidized by the Essential Air Service program.

The Federal Aviation Administration says this airport had 4201 passenger boardings (enplanements) in calendar year 2018, up 19.45% from 3517 enplanements in 2017. The Federal Aviation Administration (FAA) National Plan of Integrated Airport Systems for 2017–2021 categorized it as a local general aviation facility.

Scheduled air service temporarily ceased on March 8, 2008, when Big Sky Airlines ended operations in bankruptcy. Great Lakes Airlines was given USDOT approval to take over Essential Air Service (EAS) and flights began in 2009.  Service is currently provided under EAS contract by Cape Air.

History
Glasgow Army Air Field, also known as the Glasgow Satellite Airfield, was activated on November 10, 1942. It was one of three satellite fields of Great Falls Army Air Base which accommodated a bombardment group. There were four Bomber Squadrons within this group, one located at the Great Falls Army Air Base and one at each of the three satellite air fields at Lewistown, Glasgow and Cut Bank.

The 96th Bombardment Squadron of the Second Bombardment Group arrived at Glasgow Army Air Field on November 29, 1942. Heavy bomber squadrons of the time usually consisted of 8 B-17s with 37 officers and 229 enlisted men. The satellite field was used by B-17 bomber crews from the Second Air Force during the second phase of their training. Actual bombing and gunnery training was conducted at the airfield's associated sites, Glasgow Pattern Bombing Range and the Glasgow Pattern Gunnery Range, though other training sites within the bombardment group were probably also used. The target-towing aircraft assigned to the Fort Peck Aerial Gunnery Range were also stationed at Glasgow. The last unit to complete training at Glasgow Satellite Field was the 614th Bombardment Squadron of the 401st Bombardment Group, which left for England in October 1943.

On December 1, 1944 a German prisoner-of-war camp was established at the site. On July 15, 1946 the Glasgow Army Air Field was classified surplus and it was transferred to the War Assets Administration on November 18, 1946.

The first airline flights were Frontier DC-3s in 1959; Frontier pulled out in 1980.

Facilities
The airport covers 1,552 acres (628 ha) at an elevation of 2,296 feet (700 m). It has two asphalt runways: 12/30 is 5,001 by 100 feet (1,524 x 30 m) and 8/26 is 5,000 by 75 feet (1,524 x 23 m).

In the year ending June 16, 2016 the airport had 8,230 aircraft operations, average 23 per day: 4,750 general aviation, 3,460 air taxi, and 20 military. In July 2017, 56 aircraft were based at the airport: 53 single-engine, 2 multi-engine, and 1 helicopter.

Airline and destination 

The airport has one passenger airline:

Statistics

See also 

 Montana World War II Army Airfields
 List of airports in Montana

References

Other sources

 Essential Air Service documents (Docket DOT-OST-1997-2605) from the U.S. Department of Transportation:
 Order 2005-12-20 (December 30, 2005): selecting Big Sky Transportation Co., d/b/a Big Sky Airlines, to continue providing essential air service at seven Montana communities (Glasgow, Glendive, Havre, Lewistown, Miles City, Sidney, and Wolf Point) for a new two-year period beginning March 1, 2006, at a subsidy of $6,838,934 annually.
 Order 2007-11-21 (November 26, 2007): selecting Big Sky Transportation Co., d/b/a Big Sky Airlines, to continue providing essential air service at seven Montana communities for a new two-year period beginning March 1, 2008, at a subsidy of $8,473,617 annually.
 Order 2007-12-22 (December 21, 2007): allowing Big Sky Transportation Co., d/b/a Big Sky Airlines, to suspend its subsidized essential air services at seven Montana communities on the date that Great Lakes Aviation, Ltd., begins replacement service, and selecting Great Lakes to provide those services at subsidy rates totaling $8,201,992.
 Order 2011-1-27 (February 2, 2011): selecting Gulfstream International Airlines, to provide subsidized essential air service (EAS) with 19-passenger Beechcraft B-1900D aircraft at Glasgow, Glendive, Havre, Lewistown, Miles City, Sidney, and Wolf Point, Montana, for a two-year period beginning when the carrier inaugurates full EAS at all seven communities through the end of the 24th month thereafter (two-year period ended May 31, 2013), at a combined annual subsidy rate of $10,903,854. Aircraft: 19-passenger Beech 1900-D. Destination: Billings. The subsidy and level of service for each community is as follows: Lewistown $1,325,733 (12 nonstop round trips each week), Miles City: $1,621,821 (12 nonstop round trips each week), Sidney $2,932,152 (17 nonstop round trips each week), Havre $1,162,329 (12 one-stop round trips each week), Glendive $1,193,391 (12 one-stop round trips each week), Glasgow $1,166,049 (5 nonstop and 7 one-stop round trips each week), Wolf Point $1,502,378 (7 nonstop and 5 one-stop round trips each week).
 Notice (June 28, 2013): from Silver Airways of its intent to discontinue scheduled subsidized Essential Air Service between Glasgow, Glendive, Havre, Lewistown, Miles City, Sidney, Wolf Point, Montana and Billings, Montana. Commensurate with the end of subsidy eligibility, Silver Airways will end service to Lewistown and Miles City on July 15, 2013. Further, Silver Airways hereby serves 90-day notice of its intent to discontinue service to the communities of Glasgow, Glendive, Havre, Sidney and Wolf Point, Montana effective September 27, 2013.
 Order 2013-6-3 (June 4, 2013): extending the contract established under Order 2011-1-27, issued on February 3, 2011, for Silver Airways, Inc. (formerly Gulfstream International Airlines), to provide Essential Air Service (EAS) operations at Lewistown, Miles City, Glasgow, Glendive, Havre, Sidney, and Wolf Point, Montana, from June 1, 2013, until further notice.
 Order 2013-9-4 (September 5, 2013): selecting Hyannis Air Service, Inc., d/b/a Cape Air, to provide Essential Air Service (EAS) with 9-passenger Cessna 402 aircraft at Glasgow, Glendive, Havre, Sidney, and Wolf Point, Montana, for a two-year period beginning December 1, 2013, through November 30, 2015, at a combined annual subsidy of $11,950,426. The subsidy and level of service for each community is as follows: Glasgow $2,046,800 (2 trips per day), Glendive $1,944,467 (2 trips per day), Havre $2,036,254 (2 trips per day), Sidney $3,777,579 (5 trips per day), Wolf Point $2,145,326 (2 trips per day). Scheduled service: to Billings. Aircraft Type: Cessna 402 (9 passenger seats).
 Order 2013-12-1 (December 2, 2013): Cape Air will commence full EAS at all five of the above communities beginning December 10, 2013, thereby establishing an end date for this contract of December 31, 2015.

External links 
 Glasgow Valley County Airport website
 Choice Aviation, the fixed-base operator (FBO)
 Aerial image as of August 1996 from USGS The National Map
 
 

Airports in Montana
Transportation in Valley County, Montana
Buildings and structures in Valley County, Montana
Essential Air Service
1942 establishments in Montana
Airports established in 1942
Airfields of the United States Army Air Forces in Montana